Varjão is an administrative region in the Federal District in Brazil.

See also
List of administrative regions of the Federal District

References

External links
 Regional Administration of Varjão website
 Government of the Federal District website

Administrative regions of Federal District (Brazil)